The Fife Lake Railway  is a Canadian shortline railway company operating on trackage in Saskatchewan, Canada.  The railway is owned by seven local municipalities. The Fife Lake Railway took over the former Canadian Pacific Railway Fife Lake subdivision consisting of 94 km of trackage.

The owners of the railway include Hart Butte No. 11, Poplar Valley No. 12, Willow Bunch No. 42, Old Post No. 43, Stonehenge No. 73, Coronach, Rockglen and Great Western Railway.

Great Western Railway operates trains on behalf of the Fife Lake Railway.

References

Saskatchewan railways
Standard gauge railways in Canada